The Automotive Council UK is UK industry-run organisation that oversees the combined strategy of the whole UK automotive industry, in collaboration with the UK government.

History
It was formed in 2009.

Structure
It is headquartered in the City of Westminster on Great Peter Street near Channel 4. The council is made from people in the UK government, and chief executives in the automotive industry.

Function
It produces reports on the UK automotive industry in collaboration with the UK government, mainly the Department for Business, Energy and Industrial Strategy.

References

External links
 Automotive Council UK

2009 establishments in the United Kingdom
Automotive industry in the United Kingdom
Organisations based in the City of Westminster
Organizations established in 2009